The Toloue-4 (Dawn) is one of the first indigenously produced jet engines in Iran. The Toloue-4 mini turbojet is being built at Iran Aircraft Industries's (IACI) engine industries (TEM).

The engine is an unlicensed copy of the French Microturbo TRI 60 engine and is used in Noor anti-ship cruise missiles as well as UAVs. It is a three-stage axial design with a length of 1.3m that can produce 3.7 kN of thrust at 29,500 RPM and weights 54.7 kg. A throttleable and more durable version named Toloue-5 is also in development.

References 

2000s turbojet engines